Rebecca Kate Brown (born 8 May 1977 in Brisbane, Queensland) is a former Australian breaststroke swimmer.

Brown gained national exposure in March 1994 when, at 16 years of age, she broke Anita Nall's 200-metre breaststroke world record by 0.59 seconds in Brisbane. In the aftermath of that swim, she was feted as Australia's newest teen swimming sensation.

However, at the 1994 Commonwealth Games in Victoria, Canada she lost out to Samantha Riley in both the 100 and 200-metre breaststroke events.

Failing to qualify for the 1996 Summer Olympics in Atlanta, Georgia and the 1998 Commonwealth Games in Kuala Lumpur, Malaysia, Brown announced her retirement from competitive swimming.

However, the chance to swim at a home Olympic Games was too good an opportunity pass up. So, Brown made a pact with her then fiancé, now husband, medley swimmer Zane King that they would put everything into making the team for Sydney. For Brown this meant moving to Melbourne to link up with her former coach, Michael Piper leaving the Australian Institute of Sport-based King behind.

She was in good form leading up to the Olympics trails taking the gold in the 200-metre breaststroke at the 2000 FINA Short Course World Championships as well as 4th in the 100-metre breaststroke and 5th in the 50-metre breaststroke.

In May 2000, she secured her place in the Olympic squad with a 2:28.98-minute second place in the 200-metre breaststroke trail final. At the Olympics itself she failed to make to the final, finishing 7th in her semi-final and 14th overall in a time of 2:29.90 mins.

At the conclusion of the Games, she announced her retirement and in November 2005 she gave birth to her first child, Indiana Rose King.

See also 
 World record progression 200 metres breaststroke

References

External links
 
 

1977 births
Living people
Sportswomen from Queensland
Australian female breaststroke swimmers
Swimmers from Brisbane
Swimmers at the 1994 Commonwealth Games
Swimmers at the 2000 Summer Olympics
Commonwealth Games silver medallists for Australia
World record setters in swimming
Medalists at the FINA World Swimming Championships (25 m)
Olympic swimmers of Australia
Commonwealth Games medallists in swimming
20th-century Australian women
21st-century Australian women
Medallists at the 1994 Commonwealth Games